Kristin Kolchagova (born ) is a Bulgarian female former volleyball player, playing as a libero. She was part of the Bulgaria women's national volleyball team.

She competed at the 2009 Women's European Volleyball Championship, 2011 Women's European Volleyball Championship.

References

External links
http://www.scoresway.com/?sport=volleyball&page=player&id=2405
http://www.cev.lu/Competition-Area/PlayerDetails.aspx?TeamID=7711&PlayerID=2367&ID=555
http://bgvolleyball.com/en/bg/player.php?id=86

1991 births
Living people
Bulgarian women's volleyball players
Place of birth missing (living people)
Liberos